Rigifilida is a clade of non-ciliate phagotrophic eukaryotes. It consists of two genera: Micronuclearia and Rigifila.

Characteristics
Cells of rigifilids are covered with either a single or a double-layered submembrane pellicular lamina that makes them rigid in consistence. Slender branching filopodia emanate from a ventral aperture of the cell and are employed to collect bacteria upon which they feed and to attach the organism to the substratum. Around this aperture, the pellicle is reflexed around forming a peristomial collar.
Other notable features are flat and irregular shaped mitocondrial cristae, a single dorsal nucleus and the lack of centrioles and cilia.

Phylogeny

Taxonomy

Rigifilida is currently placed in CRuMs.

Order Rigifilida Cavalier-Smith 2012 [Micronucleariida Cavalier-Smith 2008]
 Family Rigifilidae Yabuki & Cavalier-Smith 2012
 Genus Rigifila Yabuki & Cavalier-Smith 2012
 Species Rigifila ramosa Yabuki & Cavalier-Smith 2012
 Family Micronucleariidae Cavalier-Smith 2008
 Genus Micronuclearia Mikrjukov & Mylnikov 2001 
 Species Micronuclearia podoventralis Mikrjukov & Mylnikov 2001

References 

Podiata orders